The Welsh Rugby Union Division Three West (also called the SWALEC Division Three West for sponsorship reasons) is a rugby union league in Wales.

Competition format and sponsorship

Competition
There are 12 clubs in the WRU Division Three West. During the course of a season (which lasts from September to May) each club plays the others twice, once at their home ground and once at that of their opponents for a total of 22 games for each club, with a total of 132 games in each season. Teams receive four points for a win and two point for a draw, an additional bonus point is awarded to either team if they score four tries or more in a single match. No points are awarded for a loss though the losing team can gain a bonus point for finishing the match within seven points of the winning team. Teams are ranked by total points, then the number of tries scored and then points difference. At the end of each season, the club with the most points is crowned as champion. If points are equal the tries scored then points difference determines the winner. The team who is declared champion at the end of the season is eligible for promotion to the WRU Division Two West. The two lowest placed teams are relegated into the WRU Division Four West.

Sponsorship 
In 2008 the Welsh Rugby Union announced a new sponsorship deal for the club rugby leagues with SWALEC valued at £1 million (GBP). The initial three year sponsorship was extended at the end of the 2010/11 season, making SWALEC the league sponsors until 2015. The leagues sponsored are the WRU Divisions one through to seven.

 (2002-2005) Lloyds TSB
 (2005-2008) Asda
 (2008-2015) SWALEC

2011/2012 season

League Teams

 Cardigan RFC
 Dunvant RFC
 Gorseinon RFC
 Haverfordwest RFC
 Lampeter Town RFC
 Llandeilo RFC
 Newcastle Emlyn RFC
 Penclawdd RFC
 Pontarddulais RFC
 Pontyberem RFC
 Tenby United RFC
 Tumble RFC

2011/2012 Table

2010/2011 season

League Teams
 Crymych RFC
 Dunvant RFC
 Gorseinon RFC
 Haverfordwest RFC
 Lampeter Town RFC
 Laugharne RFC
 Llandeilo RFC
 Llanelli Wanderers RFC
 Mumbles RFC
 Penclawdd RFC
 Pontarddulais RFC
 Tumble RFC

2010/2011 Table

2009/2010 season

League Teams
 Cardigan RFC
 Crymych RFC
 Gorseinon RFC
 Haverfordwest RFC
 Lampeter Town RFC
 Laugharne RFC
 Llandeilo RFC
 Llanelli Wanderers RFC
 Llanybydder RFC
 Morriston RFC
 Newcastle Emlyn RFC
 Penclawdd RFC

2009/2010 Table

2008/2009 season

League Teams
 Aberystwyth RFC
 Amman United RFC
 Cardigan RFC
 Crymych RFC
 Haverfordwest RFC
 Lampeter Town RFC
 Laugharne RFC
 Llanelli Wanderers RFC
 Llanybydder RFC
 Newcastle Emlyn RFC
 Pontyberem RFC
 Tumble RFC

2008/2009 Table

1 Llanybydder were deducted 8 points for playing and then winning a match with an ineligible player

2007/2008 season

League Teams
 Aberystwyth RFC
 Amman United RFC
 Ammanford RFC
 Cardigan RFC
 Cwmgors RFC
 Haverfordwest RFC
 Lampeter Town RFC
 Laugharne RFC
 Llanelli Wanderers RFC
 Llanybydder RFC
 Newcastle Emlyn RFC
 Pembroke Dock Harlequins RFC

2007/2008 Table

2006/2007 season

League Teams
 Aberystwyth RFC
 Ammanford RFC
 Haverfordwest RFC
 Lampeter Town RFC
 Laugharne RFC
 Llanelli Wanderers RFC
 Llangefni RFC
 Newcastle Emlyn RFC
 Pembroke Dock Harlequins RFC
 Pontarddulais RFC
 Trimsaran RFC
 Tumble RFC

2006/2007 Table

References

5